is a district located in Nagano Prefecture, Japan.

As of 2003, the district has an estimated population of 7,643 and a density of 24.96 persons per km2. The total area is 306.25 km2.

Towns and villages
Sakae

Mergers
On April 1, 2005 the village of Toyota merged into the city of Nakano.

Districts in Nagano Prefecture